Hans-Jürgen Borchers (24 January 1926, Hamburg – 10 September 2011, Göttingen) was a mathematical physicist at the Georg-August-Universität Göttingen who worked on operator algebras and quantum field theory. He introduced Borchers algebras and the Borchers commutation relations and Borchers classes in quantum field theory. He was awarded the Max Planck Medal in 1994. Among his students is Jakob Yngvason.

Selected publications

References

External links
Department faculty list

20th-century German mathematicians
20th-century German physicists
1926 births
2011 deaths
Winners of the Max Planck Medal
Members of the Göttingen Academy of Sciences and Humanities